Nevacolima jaliscoensis is a species of snout moth in the genus Nevacolima. It is found in west-central Mexico.

Most of the costal half of the  forewings is dusted with white, while the posterior half is ochre, red and reddish brown with fuscous, or black distally. The hindwings are smoky fuscous, but darker along the veins and near the costal and outer and posterior margins.

References

Moths described in 1994
Phycitini